Aminul Islam may refer to:

 Aminul Islam Chowdhury (born 1921), Bangladeshi politician and businessman
 Aminul Islam (artist) (1931–2011), Bangladeshi artist
 Aminul Islam (academic) (1935–2017), Bangladeshi soil scientist
 Aminul Islam (poet) (born 1963), Bangladeshi poet
 Aminul Islam (trade unionist) (1972–2012), Bangladeshi trade unionist
 Aminul Islam (cricketer, born 1968), Bangladeshi cricketer
 Aminul Islam (cricketer, born 1975), Bangladeshi cricketer
 Aminul Islam (cricketer, born 1999), Bangladeshi cricketer
 M. Aminul Islam, Bangladeshi diplomat
 Md. Aminul Islam (born 1969), Bangladeshi politician
 Aminul Islam (politician), member of the Assam Legislative Assembly